Konstantin Nikolayevich Korneyev (born June 5, 1984) is a Russian former professional ice hockey defenceman. He most recently played for Severstal Cherepovets of the Kontinental Hockey League (KHL).

Playing career
Drafted by the Montreal Canadiens of the National Hockey League (NHL) in 2002(9th round, 275th overall), Korneyev has played with Krylya Sovetov Moscow, Ak Bars Kazan and CSKA Moscow in Russia, but has not played in the NHL. He wins Russian Superleague 2006 with Ak Bars. During the summer of 2011 he was removed as a prospect from the Montreal Canadiens website indicating a possible rupture in their association, however this has not yet been verified.

On December 24, 2010, he was traded from HC CSKA Moscow to Ak Bars Kazan for defenseman Vyacheslav Buravchikov and a financial compensation.

He played for the Russian national team at the 2008 IIHF World Championship, 2009 IIHF World Championship, 2010 IIHF World Championship where he won two gold medals and a silver medal with the team.

Career statistics

Regular season and playoffs

International

External links

1984 births
Living people
Ak Bars Kazan players
HC CSKA Moscow players
Ice hockey players at the 2010 Winter Olympics
Krylya Sovetov Moscow players
Montreal Canadiens draft picks
Olympic ice hockey players of Russia
Russian ice hockey defencemen
Salavat Yulaev Ufa players
Severstal Cherepovets players
Ice hockey people from Moscow